Utricularia striata, the striped bladderwort, is a medium-sized affixed subaquatic carnivorous plant that belongs to the genus Utricularia. U. striata is endemic to the eastern coastal plains of the United States.

See also 
 List of Utricularia species

References 

Carnivorous plants of North America
Flora of the Eastern United States
striata